Buddle Findlay is a large top tier commercial law firm that operates throughout New Zealand, with offices in Auckland, Wellington and Christchurch.

History
In 1895 the Wellington firm of Buller & Anderson (Arthur Percival Buller and John Anderson) was founded, shortly thereafter in 1899 Findlay Dalziell & Co (John Findlay and Frederick George Dalziell) was founded. Buller & Anderson became Buddle Anderson Kent & Co (Thomas Buddle, John Anderson) following a series of mergers, while Findlay Dalziell & Co would eventually become Findlay Hoggard Richmond & Co. In 1982 the two firms merged to form Buddle Findlay. Four years later, the firm established an Auckland office through a merger with Malloy Moody & Greville, and a partial merger with Holmden Horrocks & Co. Through a merger with Christchurch firm Brookman Stock in 1989, the firm's Christchurch office was opened.

Practice areas
Buddle Findlay is a full service firm, with teams operating in:
 Aviation
 Banking and financial services
 Competition and antitrust
 Construction and projects
 Corporate and commercial
 Employment
 Environment and resource management
 Health
 Health and safety
 Insurance
 Intellectual property
 Litigation and dispute resolution
 Local government
 Māori law
 Payments
 Privacy and data protection
 Property 
 Public and administrative law
 Restructuring and insolvency
 Tax
 Technology, media and telecommunications

References

External links
 Buddle Findlay website

Law firms of New Zealand
Companies based in Wellington